The New Orleans Saints joined the National Football League (NFL) as an expansion team in 1967 and first participated in the 1967 NFL Annual Player Selection Meeting, more commonly known as the NFL Draft. In the NFL Draft, each NFL franchise annually seeks to add new players to its roster. Teams are ranked in inverse order based on the previous season's record, with the worst record picking first, and the second-worst picking second and so on. The team which wins the Super Bowl receives the last pick in the subsequent Draft, with the penultimate pick going to the losing team. Teams have the option of trading away their picks to other teams for different picks, players, cash, or a combination thereof. Thus, it is not uncommon for a team's actual draft pick to differ from their assigned draft pick, or for a team to have extra or no draft picks in any round due to these trades.

In the 1967 NFL Draft, the Saints had two first-round picks; first and last. They traded away the first overall pick to the Baltimore Colts, while with the 26th pick, they selected Leslie Kelley, a running back from Alabama. The Saints have selected first overall once, drafting George Rogers in 1981, second overall twice, drafting Archie Manning in 1971 and Reggie Bush in 2006, and third overall once, drafting Wes Chandler in 1978. The team's most recent first-round selection was tackle Trevor Penning in 2022.

Key

Player selections

Footnotes

References 
General
 
 

Specific

New Orleans Saints

first-round draft picks